Rabie Jamil Najib El Kakhi (born 9 August 1984) is a Lebanese football player and coach plays as a goalkeeper for  club Safa. He represented Lebanon internationally in both football and futsal.

Club career 
El Kakhi began his career at Safa. He moved to Akhaa Ahli Aley in 2011, simultaneously playing futsal for Sadaka in 2011. He was nominated among the best five futsal goalkeepers for 2011.

El Kakhi joined Nejmeh on 23 September 2015, on a five-year contract. On 4 August 2017, El Kakhi moved to Ansar; he returned to Safa on 8 August 2019. On 18 July 2021, El Kakhi announced his retirement. He returned from retirement on 12 February 2022, moving to Safa for a third time.

International career 
Having already represented the Lebanon national futsal team, El Kakhi returned to the team for the 2021 FIFA Futsal World Cup qualification matches against Vietnam.

Coaching career 
On 3 August 2021, El Kakhi was appointed goalkeeper coach of Akhaa Ahli Aley. He remained until February 2022, when he returned to play football.

Honours
Safa
 Lebanese Elite Cup: 2009
 Lebanese FA Cup runner-up: 2007–08, 2010–11
 Lebanese Challenge Cup runner-up: 2022

Nejmeh
 Lebanese FA Cup: 2015–16
 Lebanese Elite Cup: 2016
 Lebanese Super Cup: 2016

Individual
 Lebanese Premier League Best Save: 2004–05

See also
 List of Lebanon international footballers born outside Lebanon

References

External links

 
 
 
 

1984 births
Living people
Sportspeople from Maracaibo
Lebanese footballers
Lebanese men's futsal players
Association football goalkeepers
Futsal goalkeepers
Safa SC players
Akhaa Ahli Aley FC players
Sadaka SC futsal players
Nejmeh SC players
Al Ansar FC players
Lebanese Premier League players
Lebanon international footballers
Association football goalkeeping coaches